Zbigniew Chlebowski (born 8 March 1964 in Żarów) is a Polish politician. He was elected to the Sejm on 25 September 2005, getting 18,281 votes in 2 Wałbrzych district as a candidate from the Civic Platform list.

He was also a member of Sejm 2001-2005.

See also
Members of Polish Sejm 2005-2007

External links
Zbigniew Chlebowski - parliamentary page - includes declarations of interest, voting record, and transcripts of speeches.

1964 births
Living people
People from Żarów
Members of the Polish Sejm 2005–2007
Members of the Polish Sejm 2001–2005
Civic Platform politicians
Members of the Polish Sejm 2007–2011